Gando (Persian: گاندو, romanized: Gando) is a spy thriller Iranian TV series directed by Javad Afshar and written by Arash Ghaderi. The first episode was broadcast on June 15, 2019 from the state network IRIB TV3. The series is about the Iranian security police and solving the security case called Gando and the adventures that take place during this case.

Story 
From ISNA, according to the author of the series, in general, 80 percent of the story, apart from the narrative of Michael Hashemian and Jason Rezaian, was his imagination.

This isn't true that 80 percent of the text was not real, said Arash Ghaderi, author of the series During the Gando press conference. He expressed our work was based on a real case, but we needed a story for drama and storytelling. We had some real cases that we had to connect with each other through stories.

Series title 
The serial's name is derived from the Balochi word for Mugger crocodile, a freshwater crocodile whose habitat extends from the Indian subcontinent to Southern Iran.

Cast

Reception

Awards and nominations

Rating 
According to Islamic republic of Iran broadcasting, a poll conducted on July 11 from all over the country that shows 80.5% of the people have watched the programs of television, among them, the TV series Gando recorded 44% of the rating.

References 

2010s Iranian television series
Police procedural television series